Copperbelt was an electoral district which returned a member to the Legislative Assembly of Yukon, Canada. It included the Whitehorse subdivisions of Hillcrest, Granger, Pineridge, MacRae, and part of Copper Ridge. It also included the Lobird mobile home park.

The riding was divided into the new ridings of Copperbelt South, Copperbelt North, Mountainview, and Takhini-Kopper King in 2009. The substantial amount of new housing development in the riding since its creation had led to a significant increase in population that had imbalanced the riding's size compared to others in the territory.

Copperbelt is the former seat of Yukon Liberal Party leader Arthur Mitchell, who was Yukon's Leader of the Official Opposition from 2005-2011.

Members of the Legislative Assembly

Election results

2006 general election

|-
 
|Liberal
|Arthur Mitchell
|align="right"| 632
|align="right"| 52.5%
|align="right"| +3.0%

|NDP
|David Hedmann
|align="right"| 191
|align="right"| 15.9%
|align="right"| -14.8%
|- bgcolor="white"
!align="left" colspan=3|Total
!align="right"| 1204
!align="right"| 100.0%
!align="right"| –

2005 by-election

|-
 
|Liberal
|Arthur Mitchell
|align="right"|459
|align="right"|49.5%
|align="right"|+16.9%

|NDP
|Maureen Stephens
|align="right"|285
|align="right"|30.7%
|align="right"|+3.2%

|- bgcolor="white"
!align="left" colspan=3|Total
!align="right"| 927
!align="right"| 100.0%
!align="right"| –

On the resignation of Haakon Arntzen (September 2005).

2002 general election

|-

 
|Liberal
|Arthur Mitchell
|align="right"| 312
|align="right"| 32.6%
|align="right"| –
|-

|NDP
|Lillian Grubach-Hambrook
|align="right"| 263
|align="right"| 27.5%
|align="right"| –
|- bgcolor="white"
!align="left" colspan=3|Total
!align="right"| 957
!align="right"| 100.0%
!align="right"| –

References

Former Yukon territorial electoral districts
Politics of Whitehorse